Eva Lisa Gullberg (born 16 April 1970) is a Swedish windsurfer. She competed in the women's Lechner A-390 event at the 1992 Summer Olympics.

References

External links
 
 
 

1970 births
Living people
Swedish windsurfers
Female windsurfers
Swedish female sailors (sport)
Olympic sailors of Sweden
Sailors at the 1992 Summer Olympics – Lechner A-390
Sportspeople from Västerås
20th-century Swedish women